Buzzards Bay station is a train station located on Main Street in Buzzards Bay, Massachusetts. The site also contains an interlocking tower. The Cape Cod Canal Railroad Bridge is adjacent.

Buzzards Bay is an intermediate stop on the Cape Cod Regional Transit Authority's CapeFLYER summer weekend passenger service.  It is also the westernmost stop of the Cape Cod Central Railroad. Extension of MBTA Commuter Rail service on the Middleborough/Lakeville Line to the station has been proposed on several occasions, but never enacted.

History

Originally known as Cohasset Narrows, the station was built as part of the Cape Cod Branch Railroad in 1848. Its name was changed to Buzzards Bay on August 1, 1879 by the Old Colony Railroad who had acquired the line in 1872 with a merger of the Cape Cod Railroad.

The present station building was constructed by the New York, New Haven and Hartford Railroad in 1912.
Prior to the opening of the Cape Cod Canal in 1916, Buzzards Bay was located on what was then the north bank of the Monument River at a junction of the main railroad line between Middleborough and Cape Cod and the branch to Woods Hole. The Woods Hole Branch crossed the river slightly west of what is now the Cape Cod Canal Railroad Bridge, while the Cape Cod main line continued along the north side of the river before crossing where the river narrowed at Bourne. The Monument River was converted into the Cape Cod Canal, which opened in 1916. The Cape Cod Main Line and junction were moved to the south side of the canal, which was later widened in the 1930s. Into the 1960s the New Haven Railroad operated daily passenger service to Boston and seasonal day and night Cape Codder service to New York City.

Originally located near the tracks, the station building is now set back from the train line because of the removal of excess trackage. The station also houses year-round offices and a seasonal visitor's center for the Cape Cod Canal Region Chamber of Commerce.

It was a stop for Amtrak's Cape Codder which ran from 1986 to 1996 (again, New York to the Cape), and for the Cape Cod and Hyannis Railroad which ran from 1984 to 1988. In 1988, the state refurbished the station building and added an accessible platform in preparation for never-realized commuter rail service.

Cape Cod Central Railroad
Buzzards Bay serves as the western terminus for Cape Cod Central Railroad, which runs tourist excursion trains along the track between Buzzards Bay and Hyannis. In the summer, Buzzards Bay serves as a station of departure for excursion trains running to West Barnstable, select dinner trains running along the length of the Canal, and a special excursion in mid-September to celebrate Cape Cod Canal Day, which includes a stop at the Pairpoint Glass facility in Sagamore. In the winter, Buzzards Bay is the point of departure for several Polar Express-esque holiday excursions.

CapeFLYER and proposed commuter service

Original plans for the reopening of the Middleborough/Lakeville Line in the 1990s called for service to Wareham or beyond; however, plans were scaled back and the line was only opened to Middleborough/Lakeville in 1997. In 2007, the Boston Region Metropolitan Planning Organization released a report evaluating the possibility of commuter rail service to Buzzards Bay including several intermediate stops. However, other projects like the Greenbush Line received priority and the extension to Buzzards Bay was not constructed.

In 2014, a new high-level platform was built closer to the bridge. This platform allows CapeFLYER trains (which, like other MBTA trains, place the first car at the mini-high platforms) to avoid blocking the Academy Drive crossing while stopped at the station. In November 2014, it was announced that an improved siding would be fully restored near the station, including a universal crossover before Cohasset Narrows.

The relative success of the CapeFLYER has brought new attention to the possibility of extending the Middleborough/Lakeville Line. The possibility was seriously discussed before the end of its first summer season. In September 2013, the Wareham Chamber of Commerce announced that based on the success of the CapeFLYER, the Chamber supported commuter rail extension to Buzzards Bay. The Buzzards Bay town selectmen similarly supported the idea later that year, and a public forum was held in January 2014.

Bourne’s Transportation Advisory Committee began studying the possibility in mid-2014, with the addition of work by MassDOT's Central Transportation Planning Staff (CTPS) in November 2014. The CTPS data estimated ridership at 875 daily riders if all Middleborough trains were extended to Buzzards Bay, or slightly fewer with a limited number of trains.

Bourne voted to join the MBTA district in 2015 and began paying an assessment in mid 2016 (for FY 2017), although there was no guarantee that commuter rail service would be provided in the fiscally constrained environment. For FY 2017, Bourne paid $41,707 to the MBTA plus an existing $88,429 to the CCRTA for existing bus service. MassDOT began planning a possible commuter rail trial service in October 2015. In February 2016, state representatives and CCRTA administrator Thomas Cahir said that the state wished to begin trial service during FY 2017, possibly by the end of 2016. However, the proposal was rejected by the MBTA Fiscal Management and Control Board in April 2016. In 2019, town officials raised the possibility of leaving the MBTA because the agency had no plans to extend service to Bourne within the next two decades. Withdrawal was rejected by residents at a June 2020 town meeting. 

In fall 2020, the MBTA began conducting a study to evaluate the feasibility of implementing Buzzards Bay commuter rail service in conjunction with the currently-underway South Coast Rail project. Upon completion of the study in spring 2021, two different alternatives for service were presented, one of which would terminate at Buzzards Bay and the other of which would continue to Bourne station.

References

Further reading

External links

CapeFLYER Train Stations
Google Maps Street View image of the station
Buzzards Bay Station and Vicinity (Cape Cod Rails)

Bourne, Massachusetts
Old Colony Railroad Stations on Cape Cod
Cape Cod Central Railroad stations
Stations along Old Colony Railroad lines
Former Amtrak stations in Massachusetts
Railway stations in the United States opened in 1872
MBTA Commuter Rail stations in Barnstable County, Massachusetts
1872 establishments in Massachusetts